Heritage Falls is a 2016 American comedy-drama film starring David Keith.

Plot

Three men reconciling intergenerational differences on a retreat is the topic of this film.

Cast
David Keith as Coach Charlie Fitzpatrick
Coby Ryan McLaughlin as Charles 'Evan' Fitzpatrick Jr.
Keean Johnson as Markie Fitzpatrick
Nancy Stafford as Laura Fitzpatrick
Toochukwu T.C. Anyachonkeya as Alumni #3
J.D. Banks as Alumni #2
Graham Eugene Adrian as Alumni #1
Vitaly Andrew LeBeau as Young Evan
Gary Ray Moore as Referee
Devon Ogden as Harriet 'Harvey' Fitzpatrick
Sydney Penny as Heather Fitzpatrick
T.C. Stallings as Principal Joe Allen

Production
The film was shot in Stephens County, Georgia, particularly in Toccoa.

Filming began in April 2016.

Reception
Edwin L. Carpenter of The Dove Foundation gave the film a positive review and wrote, "The story, the character growth, and the message are inspired. The film makes it clear: people can grow in their relationships, and even change."

References

External links
 
 
 

2016 films
Films shot in Georgia (U.S. state)
American comedy-drama films
2016 comedy-drama films
2010s English-language films
2010s American films